Nobumasa (written: 信昌, 信正, 信政 or 永将) is a masculine Japanese given name. Notable people with the name include:

, Japanese daimyō
, Japanese baseball player
, Japanese daimyō
, Imperial Japanese Navy admiral
, Japanese daimyō

Japanese masculine given names